The 1987 Alabama Crimson Tide football team (variously "Alabama", "UA", "Bama" or "The Tide") represented the University of Alabama in the 1987 NCAA Division I-A football season. It was the Crimson Tide's 95th overall and 54th season as a member of the Southeastern Conference (SEC). The team was led by head coach Bill Curry, in his first year, and played their home games at Legion Field in Birmingham, Alabama. They finished the season with a record of seven wins and five losses (7–5 overall, 4–3 in the SEC) and with a loss in the Hall of Fame Bowl to Michigan.

Due to a major renovation project that resulted in the completion of the western upper deck, Alabama played all of their home games at Legion Field instead of splitting them with Bryant–Denny Stadium for the 1987 season.

Schedule

Roster

Season summary

at LSU

References
General

 

Specific

Alabama
Alabama Crimson Tide football seasons
Alabama Crimson Tide football